Jackie Shane (May 15, 1940 – February 21, 2019) was an American soul and rhythm and blues singer, who was most prominent in the local music scene of Toronto, Ontario, Canada, in the 1960s. Considered to be a pioneer transgender performer, she was a contributor to the Toronto Sound and is best known for the single "Any Other Way", which was a regional Top 10 hit in Toronto in 1962 and a modest national chart hit across Canada in 1967.

Background
Originally from Nashville, Tennessee, she was born on May 15, 1940. She began performing locally in the 1950s wearing long hair, make-up, and jewelry. Vowing to escape the "Jim Crow South", in the late 1950s, she joined a traveling carnival and arrived in Cornwall, Ontario, in 1959, where she said she felt free for the first time.

In 1960, Shane moved to Montreal, Quebec, where saxophonist "King" Herbert Whitaker invited her along to watch the popular band Frank Motley and his Motley Crew at the Esquire Show Bar. Shane showed up and sat down near the front. When Motley said, "Get that kid up here and let's see what he can do," pianist Curley Bridges invited Shane, then still presenting as a man, onstage for the next set, where she performed songs by Ray Charles and Bobby "Blue" Bland.

She was soon the band's lead vocalist, and relocated to Toronto with them in late 1961. She returned several times to the United States, on tour with the Motley Crew (to Boston, for example, where they recorded), to New York to record, to visit her family and old friends and perform on a TV show in Nashville, or to live and work in Los Angeles where she played drums in recording sessions. A fan mythology linked her to Little Richard, including claims that she had been Richard's backing vocalist before moving to Canada or even that she was Richard's cousin, although no verification of either claim has ever been found and no evidence exists that Shane ever made either claim herself. Music critic Carl Wilson has concluded that, while in reality Shane had deep and identifiable roots in the traditions of the Southern US Chitlin Circuit, the mythology emerged because that scene's traditions were not known to Torontonians in the 1960s, and thus Little Richard was the only antecedent for Shane's performing style that most of her local fan base could identify.

Throughout her active musical career and for many years thereafter, Shane was written about by nearly all sources as a man who performed in ambiguous clothing that strongly suggested femininity, with some sources even directly labeling her as a drag queen. The few sources that actually sought out her own words on the matter of her own gender identification were more ambiguous, however; she identified herself as male in two early quotes to the Toronto Star, but more often appeared to simply dodge questions about her gender altogether. Her identity as a trans woman was not confirmed on the record by a media outlet until music journalist Elio Iannacci interviewed her for The Globe and Mail in 2017.

Recording career
She released her first single, a cover of Barrett Strong's "Money (That's What I Want)", in 1962. "I've Really Got the Blues" was the single's B-side. Shortly thereafter, the same label released an alternate version of the single on which "Money" was relegated to the B-side, while a different recording of "I've Really Got the Blues", with a few revised lyrics and the alternate title "Have You Ever Had the Blues?", became the A-side.

She followed up with "Any Other Way" (b/w "Sticks and Stones") later the same year, in the fall of 1962; the song became her biggest chart hit, reaching #2 on Toronto's CHUM Chart in 1963. A cover of a song previously recorded and released by William Bell in summer 1962, Shane's version was noted for adding a different spin to the lyric "Tell her that I'm happy/tell her that I'm gay"; while the original lyric intended the word "gay" in its older meaning as a synonym of "happy", Shane played on the word's double meaning, which was not yet in mainstream usage.

The follow-up single to "Any Other Way" was "In My Tenement" b/w "Comin' Down". It received some airplay in upstate New York, but did not chart elsewhere in the US or Canada, and Shane did not record again for several years.

In 1962, Shane was performing at Toronto's Saphire Tavern, specializing in covers of songs by Ray Charles and Bobby Bland. In 1965, she made a television appearance in Nashville on WLAC-TV's Night Train, performing Rufus Thomas' "Walking the Dog". Around the same time, she was offered an appearance on The Ed Sullivan Show, but refused as the booking was made conditional on her presenting as male.

In 1967, "Any Other Way" was reissued and became a modest hit across Canada, peaking at #68 on the national RPM chart in March. Shane subsequently returned to recording later that year, issuing the single "Stand Up Straight and Tall" b/w "You Are My Sunshine" (which peaked at #87 on RPM), and the live album Jackie Shane Live. A final single, "Cruel Cruel World" b/w "New Way of Lovin'", was released in 1969.

In addition to her own recordings, Shane also appeared on Motley's album Honkin' at Midnight, performing live versions of some of the singles she had released under her own name.

Shane faded in prominence after 1970–71, with even her own former bandmates losing touch with her; soon after returning to Los Angeles, she turned down an offer to be a part of George Clinton's band Funkadelic. She began caring for her mother, Jessie Shane, who lived in Los Angeles, before relocating to Nashville around 1996 after the death of her mother.

For a time she was rumoured to have died by suicide or to have been stabbed to death in the 1990s, but in fact she had retired from music, and moved home to Nashville from Los Angeles. She kept in touch with Frank Motley, who put a Toronto record collector in touch with her in the mid 1990s.  This news was relayed to a small number of her old musician friends, a couple of whom contacted her.  One, Steve Kennedy, discussed with Shane the possibility of organizing and staging a reunion concert, but this never materialized — the next time Kennedy called the same phone number, it had been reassigned to somebody else who had never heard of Shane.

Post-career attention
CBC Radio's Inside the Music aired a documentary feature, "I Got Mine: The Story of Jackie Shane", in 2010. At the time, nobody involved in the documentary, the executive producer of which was Steve Kennedy's wife, had been able to determine whether Shane was still alive; but she was subsequently found, still living in Nashville.

Footage of Shane in performance also appeared in Bruce McDonald's 2011 documentary television series Yonge Street: Toronto Rock & Roll Stories.

Jackie Shane Live was reissued as a bootleg in 2011 on Vintage Music as Live at the Saphire Tavern, although the reissue was inaccurately labelled as being from 1963. Several of the original songs covered in the set list were release much later in the 1960s. A compilation bootleg of the studio singles and rarities, Soul Singles Classics, was released the same year. OPM subsequently reissued the album under its original title.

In 2015, the Polaris Music Prize committee shortlisted Jackie Shane Live as one of the nominees for the 1960s–1970s component of its inaugural Heritage Award to honour classic Canadian albums. It did not win, but has been renominated in subsequent years.

In 2017, a group of Toronto writers published the essay anthology Any Other Way: How Toronto Got Queer, a history of LGBT culture in Toronto; in addition to taking its title from Shane's 1962 single, the book includes an essay devoted specifically to Shane.

In the summer of 2017, the reissue label Numero Group announced that they would be releasing a double-LP/CD compilation of Shane's music, Any Other Way, on October 20, 2017. The album marked the first time since her final single in 1969 that Shane was directly involved in the production and release of a reissue of her music. The album was nominated for a Grammy Award in the Best Historical Album category. In a revealing interview with Elio Iannacci of The Globe and Mail, Shane stated she was planning to return to Toronto to perform live for the first time in nearly five decades.

In 2019, Shane granted a broadcast interview to CBC Radio One's Q. The interview was conducted by Elaine Banks, who had been the producer and host of "I Got Mine", and was Shane's first broadcast interview since the end of her performing career. In the interview, she confirmed that she returned home to the United States to take care of her ailing mother, but stated that she regretted not having chosen to bring her mother to Toronto instead.

Death

Shane died in her sleep, at her home in Nashville, on February 21, 2019. Her death was reported to media the following day.

In 2022, Shane was the subject of a Heritage Minute commercial, in which she was portrayed by transgender activist Ravyn Wngz.

Discography

Singles
"Money (That's What I Want)" b/w "I've Really Got the Blues" (1962)
"Have You Ever Had the Blues?" b/w "Money (That's What I Want)" (1962)
"Any Other Way" b/w "Sticks and Stones" (1962)
"In My Tenement" b/w "Comin' Down" (1963)
"Stand Up Straight and Tall" b/w "You Are My Sunshine" (1967)
"Cruel Cruel World" b/w "New Way of Lovin'" (1969)

Albums
Jackie Shane Live (Caravan Records, 1967)
Honkin' at Midnight (2000, bootleg, with Frank Motley and his Motley Crew)
Live at the Saphire Tavern (2011, bootleg)
Soul Singles Classics (2011, bootleg)
Jackie Shane Live (2015, reissue)

Compilations
"Slave for You Baby" and "Chickadee" on The Original Blues Sound of Charles Brown & Amos Milburn with Jackie Shane-Bob Marshall & The Crystals (Grand Prix/Pickwick, 1965)
Any Other Way (Numero Group, 2017)

References

1940 births
2019 deaths
American soul singers
American rhythm and blues singers
American women singers
American emigrants to Canada
Black Canadian LGBT people
20th-century Black Canadian women singers
Canadian soul singers
Canadian rhythm and blues singers
Canadian women singers
Canadian people of African-American descent
Canadian LGBT singers
American LGBT singers
LGBT African Americans
LGBT people from Tennessee
Musicians from Nashville, Tennessee
Musicians from Toronto
Transgender women musicians
Singers from Tennessee
20th-century African-American women singers
Transgender singers
20th-century Canadian LGBT people